Radial spoke head 10 homolog B2 is a protein that in humans is encoded by the RSPH10B gene.

References

Further reading